Otjiwarongo Airport  is an airport serving Otjiwarongo, in the Otjozondjupa Region of Namibia.

See also

List of airports in Namibia
Transport in Namibia

References

External links
 OurAirports - Otjiwarongo
 Otjiwarongo Airport
 OpenStreetMap - Otjiwarongo

Airports in Namibia